Gusti Ayu Oka Kaba-Kaba was regent of Mengwi, a principality in East Bali, from 1770/80-1807. She was regent for her son Gusti Agung Putu Agung after her husband Gusti Agung Made Munggu died, and from 1793/4 until 1807 she was regent for her grandson.

References

Monarchs of Bali
18th-century women rulers
19th-century women rulers
18th-century Indonesian women
19th-century Indonesian women